Raving may refer to:
Rave, a party 
Raving, Iran, a village in Hormozgan Province, Iran
Official Monster Raving Loony Party, a single-issue, parodical political party in the United Kingdom
Raving (film), a film
Rayman Raving Rabbids, a Wii video game